DXKS (95.1 FM), on-air as 95.1 Energy FM, is a radio station owned and operated by Ultrasonic Broadcasting System. Its studios and transmitters are located at the 3rd Floor, Gementiza Bldg., Osmeña St., Tagum.

References

Radio stations established in 2006
Radio stations in Davao del Norte